Tihomir Todorov (born 20 December 1969) is a retired Bulgarian football goalkeeper.

References

1969 births
Living people
Bulgarian footballers
Neftochimic Burgas players
PFC Dobrudzha Dobrich players
Apollon Smyrnis F.C. players
PFC Marek Dupnitsa players
PFC Rodopa Smolyan players
Association football goalkeepers
Super League Greece players
Bulgarian expatriate footballers
Expatriate footballers in Greece
Bulgarian expatriate sportspeople in Greece